Curiosities Volume I is an album by English musician Brian Eno, released in 2003 by record label Opal Ltd. It is the first in a series of albums compiling Eno's previously unreleased recordings.

Track listing 

All songs written by Brian Eno, except "Manila Envelope", by Eno and Robert Fripp.

 "Select a Bonk" – 5:23
 "Draw One Animal" – 3:09
 "Ambient Savage" – 3:53
 "Circus Mathematics" – 1:38
 "Castro Haze" – 4:48
 "Groan Wash" – 3:56
 "Cheeky Hop" – 3:29
 "Work/Wank" – 2:02
 "Late Evening in Jersey" – 4:37
 "Slow Lump with Strings" – 4:55
 "Never Tunneling" – 3:36
 "My Lonely Organ" – 3:58
 "Weird Bird Call Carnival" – 1:13
 "War Fetish" – 2:00
 "Manila Envelope" (with Robert Fripp) – 5:27

Personnel 

 Brian Eno – performer
 Robert Fripp – performer on "Manila Envelope"
 Richard Bailey – drums on "Castro Haze"

 Technical

 Marlon Weyeneth – researching and compilation

External links 

 BBC Music review
 Exclaim review

Brian Eno compilation albums
2003 compilation albums
Albums produced by Brian Eno